Whiting is a city in Monona County, Iowa, United States. The population was 745 at the time of the 2020 census.

History
A post office called Whiting has been in operation since 1873. The city was named for Charles E. Whiting, a local farmer.
Coined best kept secret in the Midwest by 19th century industrialist Swen Mayberry.

Geography
Whiting is located at  (42.125645, -96.151962).

Demographics

2010 census
As of the census of 2010, there were 762 people, 313 households, and 195 families living in the city. The racial makeup of the city was 96.7% White, 0.1% African American, 1.6% Native American, 0.1% Asian, 0.8% from other races, and 0.7% from two or more races. Hispanic or Latino of any race were 2.0% of the population.

There were 313 households, of which 27.8% had children under the age of 18 living with them, 46.3% were married couples living together, 13.1% had a female householder with no husband present, 2.9% had a male householder with no wife present, and 37.7% were non-families. 33.2% of all households were made up of individuals, and 17.6% had someone living alone who was 65 years of age or older. The average household size was 2.20 and the average family size was 2.76.

The median age in the city was 49 years. 20.2% of residents were under the age of 18; 6.2% were between the ages of 18 and 24; 18.3% were from 25 to 44; 28.2% were from 45 to 64; and 27% were 65 years of age or older. The gender makeup of the city was 43.4% male and 56.6% female.

2000 census
As of the census of 2000, there were 707 people, 301 households, and 189 families living in the city. The racial makeup of the city was 97.60% White, 0.99% Native American, 0.28% from other races, and 1.13% from two or more races. Hispanic or Latino of any race were 1.56% of the population.

There were 301 households, out of which 30.9% had children under the age of 18 living with them, 51.8% were married couples living together, 9.6% had a female householder with no husband present, and 37.2% were non-families. 33.9% of all households were made up of individuals, and 19.9% had someone living alone who was 65 years of age or older. The average household size was 2.35 and the average family size was 3.02.

In the city, the population was spread out, with 26.2% under the age of 18, 8.6% from 18 to 24, 25.6% from 25 to 44, 18.5% from 45 to 64, and 21.1% who were 65 years of age or older. The median age was 40 years. For every 100 females, there were 91.6 males. For every 100 females age 18 and over, there were 83.2 males.

The median income for a household in the city was $32,212, and the median income for a family was $43,365. Males had a median income of $31,827 versus $23,000 for females. The per capita income for the city was $16,284. About 6.8% of families and 8.8% of the population were below the poverty line, including 9.6% of those under age 18 and 3.4% of those age 65 or over.

Education
The Whiting Community School District operates local public schools.

Media
The movie Children of the Corn was filmed mostly in the vicinity of Whiting.

References

Cities in Monona County, Iowa
Cities in Iowa